Cupha arias is an Indomalayan species of heliconiine butterfly.

Subspecies
C. a. arias (North Philippines)
C. a. dapatana Grose-Smith, 1887 (South Philippines)
C. a. cacina Fruhstorfer, 1912 (Palawan, Balabac, Borneo)
C. a. muna Fruhstorfer, 1898 (Muna Island)
C. a. celebensis Fruhstorfer, 1900 (Sulawesi)
C. a. sangirica Fruhstorfer, 1912 (Sangihe, Talaud)

References

External links
images representing Cupha arias at Encyclopedia of Life

Vagrantini
Butterflies described in 1867
Taxa named by Baron Cajetan von Felder
Taxa named by Rudolf Felder
Butterflies of Asia